SS Robert E. Lee was a steam passenger ship built for the Eastern Steamship Lines in 1924. It was sunk on 30 July 1942 after being torpedoed by the German submarine  on its return to New Orleans.

Construction  
SS Robert E. Lee was built in Newport News, Virginia, and finished construction in 1924. The ship was constructed to primarily transport passengers between Virginia and New York.

History 

In February 1942, Robert E. Lee was chartered by the Alcoa Steamship Company to transport goods and personnel from New York to ports located in the Caribbean. One month later, she was contracted by the War Shipping Administration as a freight carrier and was subsequently armed with a stern gun and degaussed to prevent magnetic mine attacks.

Sinking 
On 30 July 1942, Robert E. Lee left Trinidad with around 270 passengers bound for Tampa, Florida. She initially traveled with convoy TAW-7, but was soon diverted to New Orleans along with the submarine chaser .

The torpedo struck just aft of the engine room and destroyed the #3 hold. Further damage was also done to the radio compartment and the steering gear.

The ship began to list to port, and then starboard, before finally sinking by the stern about 15 minutes after the torpedo hit. Of the 407 crewmen and passengers, 15 passengers and 10 crewmen died in the sinking.

Wreckage 
In 1986, an oil and gas survey conducted by Shell Offshore discovered the shipwreck of Robert E. Lee in the Mississippi Canyon. In January 2001, the wreckage was once again spotted, but this time it was located by C & C Technologies.

References

External links 
 SS Robert E. Lee information at NOAA.
 SS Robert E. Lee information at Nautilus Live.

1924 ships
Passenger ships
Ships sunk by German submarines in World War II
Maritime incidents in July 1942
1986 archaeological discoveries